Walter Farquhar was a Scottish physician.

Walter Farquhar may also refer to:

Sir Walter Rockliffe Farquhar, 3rd Baronet (1810–1900), of the Farquhar baronets
Sir Walter Randolph Fitzroy Farquhar, 5th Baronet (1878–1918), of the Farquhar baronets
Sir Walter Minto Townsend-Farquhar, 2nd Baronet (1809–1866), of the Farquhar baronets

See also
Farquhar (disambiguation)